The High Commissioner of the United Kingdom to Jamaica is the United Kingdom's foremost diplomatic representative in Jamaica, and head of the UK's diplomatic mission in Jamaica.

As fellow members of the Commonwealth of Nations, diplomatic relations between the United Kingdom and Jamaica are at governmental level, rather than between Heads of State.  Thus, the countries exchange High Commissioners rather than ambassadors.

Between 2005 and 2019, the British High Commissioner to Jamaica was also non-resident High Commissioner to The Bahamas.

High Commissioners to Jamaica 
 1962–1965: Sir Alexander Morley   
 1965–1970: Dalton Murray   
 1970–1973: Sir Nick Larmour   
 1973–1976: John Hennings   
 1976–1981: John Drinkall   
 1982–1984: Barry Smallman   
 1984–1987: Sir Martin Reid   
 1987–1989: Alan Payne   
 1989–1995: Derek Milton   
 1995–1999: Richard Thomas   
 1999–2002: Antony Smith CMG 
 2002–2005: Peter Mathers   
 2005–2009: Jeremy Cresswell   
 2009–2013: Howard Drake   
 2013–2017: David Fitton   
 2017–2021: Asif Ahmad  

 2021–: Judith Slater

References

External links 
British High Commission Kingston

Jamaica
 
United Kingdom High Commissioners